Saint-Méry is a commune in the Seine-et-Marne department in the Île-de-France region in north-central France.

History
Towards the end of the seventh century, Saint Mederic, abbot of Saint-Martin d'Autun, set off on a pilgrimage to the tombs of Saint Denis and Saint Germain, in Paris, in the company of a young monk named Frodulphe. The road was long because the abbot, aging and tired, had to stop often to take rest. It was thus that Mederic and Frodulphe halted at a deserted spot near Paris, where a chapel was then erected to commemorate the pilgrim abbe, whose charity, piety, and miracles had struck the people. Soon some houses came to group around the building placed under the name of Saint-Médéric said Saint-Merry, Saint-Merri or Saint-Méry.

Population

Inhabitants of Saint-Méry are called Médériciens.

See also
Communes of the Seine-et-Marne department

References

External links

1999 Land Use, from IAURIF (Institute for Urban Planning and Development of the Paris-Île-de-France région) 

Communes of Seine-et-Marne